Red Morning is a 1934 American adventure film directed by Wallace Fox from a screenplay by John Twist and Wallace Fox, based on a story by Gouverneur Morris.  The film stars Steffi Duna, Regis Toomey, Raymond Hatton, and Mitchell Lewis.

Cast
Steffi Duna as Kara Perava
Regis Toomey as John Hastings
Raymond Hatton as Hawker
Mitchell Lewis as Captain Perava
Charles Middleton as Stanchon
George J. Lewis as Mao
Francis McDonald as Sakki
Pat West as Glibb
Brandon Hurst as Island Magistrate
Willie Fung as Ship's Steward
Olaf Hytten as McTavish
Alphonse Ethier as The Village Chief
Lionel Belmore as The Storekeeper
James Marcus as The Hotel Keeper
Pope Epili Cakobau as Native (uncredited)
George Regas as Native (uncredited)
Constantine Romanoff as Mutinous Seaman (uncredited)

References

External links 
 

1934 films
RKO Pictures films
Films produced by Cliff Reid
Films directed by Wallace Fox
Films set in Papua New Guinea
Seafaring films
American adventure films
1934 adventure films
American black-and-white films
1930s American films